Pedro (ぺどろ), stylized as PEDRO, is a Japanese band fronted by Bish member Ayuni D. They released their debut EP, Zoozoosea, on September 19, 2018.

History
In September 2018, WACK announced that Ayuni D would launch a project with Avex Trax under the name Pedro, their debut solo EP, Zoozoosea, was released that same month.  In March 2019, it was announced the Pedro had signed with the EMI Records division of Universal Music Japan, their first album, Thumb Sucker, was released under the new label later that year. They released their first EP,  on April 29, 2020. They released their first single,  on August 12, 2020. Their second album, was released on August 26, 2020. They released their third album, on November 17, 2021. Pedro went on an indefinite hiatus at the end of 2021.

Discography

Studio albums

Extended plays

Singles

References 

Japanese rock music groups
Musical groups established in 2017
Musical groups from Tokyo
2018 establishments in Japan